All My Friends Are Going Death is a compilation album by Some Girls consisting of their first two EPs, a few new songs, and demo material. Jacob Bannon, owner of Deathwish Inc. and vocalist of Converge, designed the artwork for the album. There is a limited edition LP press of 300 copies with an alternate Death In June "When We Have Each Other We Have Everything." rip off cover. The titles for tracks 2 and 3 are reversed in the track listing on the back of the jewel disc.

Track listing

Tracks 16-68 are 12 seconds each and completely silent. Track 69 is 2:28 of demo material, including demos for "His N' Hers", "Up to Our Hips", and "Sex and Glue".

Track 14, "No Fun", is a cover of The Stooges song from their self-titled debut.

References

Some Girls (California band) albums
2003 compilation albums
Deathwish Inc. compilation albums